S. J. Nissen Building, also known as S. J. Nissen Carriage Repository and Repair Shop, S. J. Nissen Company Wagonworks, Kester Machinery Company, and Black Horse Studio is a historic factory building located at Winston-Salem, Forsyth County, North Carolina.  The original 1893 primary structure is a three-story Romanesque Revival style brick building with a basement and sub basement.  It features two crenellated front towers (one square and one octagonal) and round-arched windows.  A two-story addition with basement was added in 1953. The building originally housed a wagon making and repair shop and a carriage repository.

It was listed on the National Register of Historic Places in 2007. It is located in the Winston-Salem Tobacco Historic District.

References

Industrial buildings and structures on the National Register of Historic Places in North Carolina
Romanesque Revival architecture in North Carolina
Industrial buildings completed in 1915
Buildings and structures in Winston-Salem, North Carolina
National Register of Historic Places in Winston-Salem, North Carolina
Historic district contributing properties in North Carolina